The 1999–2000 Honduran Liga Nacional was the 35th season in the Honduran top division, the tournament was divided into two halves (Apertura and Clausura) and it determined the 35th and 36th national champions in the league's history. The league games started 18 September 1999.

1999–2000 teams

 C.D. Broncos (Choluteca)
 C.D. Federal (Tegucigalpa) (promoted)
 C.D. Marathón (San Pedro Sula)
 C.D. Motagua (Tegucigalpa)
 C.D. Olimpia (Tegucigalpa)
 C.D. Platense (Puerto Cortés)
 Real C.D. España (San Pedro Sula)
 Universidad (Tegucigalpa)
 C.D. Victoria (La Ceiba)
 C.D.S. Vida (La Ceiba)

Squads

Apertura
The Apertura was the opening half of 1999–2000 season in the Honduran Liga Nacional.

Regular season

Standings

Results
 As of 22 December 1999

Final round

Hexagonal

Motagua vs Vida

 Motagua won 4–3 on aggregate.

Olimpia vs Platense

 Olimpia 2–2 Platense on aggregate; Olimpia advanced on better regular season record.

Victoria vs Broncos

 Victoria 3–3 Broncos on aggregate; Victoria advanced on better regular season record; Broncos advanced as best loser.

Semifinals

Motagua vs Broncos

 Motagua won 2–0 on aggregate.

Olimpia vs Victoria

 Olimpia won 2–1 on aggregate.

Final

Motagua vs Olimpia

 Motagua 0–0 Olimpia on aggregate; Motagua won by penalty shootouts.

Top scorer
  Wilmer Velásquez (Olimpia) with 12 goals.

Clausura
The Clausura tournament of the 1999–2000 season in the Liga Nacional de Fútbol de Honduras started on 11 March 2000 at San Pedro Sula with a scoreless match between C.D. Marathón and C.D. Platense.

Regular season

Standings

Results
 As of 2 July 2000

 Marathón–Real España suspended at 70' (2–0) as Real España had five players sent off.  Result stood.

Final round

Hexagonal

Olimpia vs Federal

 Olimpia won 4–1 on aggregate; Federal advanced as best losers.

Platense vs Marathón

 Marathón won 2–1 on aggregate.

Motagua vs Victoria

 Motagua won 4–2 on aggregate.

Semifinals

Olimpia vs Federal

 Olimpia won 4–1 on aggregate.

Motagua vs Marathón
Note: Motagua (3rd) had the right to play the second leg at home after finishing above Marathón (5th) in the regular season; Marathón however claimed they had to close the series at home after they defeated Platense in the Hexagonal who finished 2nd; eventually Motagua granted home-field advantage in the second leg at San Pedro Sula.

 Motagua 2–2 Marathón on aggregate; Motagua advanced on better regular season record.

Final

Olimpia vs Motagua

Top scorer
  Juan Manuel Cárcamo (Platense) with 14 goals

Relegation
Relegation was determined by the aggregate table of both Apertura and Clausura tournaments.

References

Liga Nacional de Fútbol Profesional de Honduras seasons
1999–2000 in Honduran football
Honduras